Suh Yong-Joo (Hangul: 서영주), 9 July 1934 – 29 August 2005, was a Korean long jumper who represented South Korea in the 1956 Summer Olympics and in the 1960 Summer Olympics.

References

1934 births
2005 deaths
South Korean male long jumpers
Olympic athletes of South Korea
Athletes (track and field) at the 1956 Summer Olympics
Athletes (track and field) at the 1960 Summer Olympics
Asian Games gold medalists for South Korea
Asian Games medalists in athletics (track and field)
Athletes (track and field) at the 1958 Asian Games
Medalists at the 1958 Asian Games